The Atomic Cafe is a 1982 American documentary film directed by Kevin Rafferty, Jayne Loader and Pierce Rafferty. It is a compilation of clips from newsreels, military training films, and other footage produced in the United States early in the Cold War on the subject of nuclear warfare. Without any narration, the footage is edited and presented in a manner to demonstrate how misinformation and propaganda was used by the U.S. government and popular culture to ease fears about nuclear weapons among the American public.

In 2016, the film was selected  for preservation in the United States National Film Registry by the Library of Congress as being "culturally, historically, or aesthetically significant."

Synopsis
The film covers the beginnings of the era of nuclear warfare, created from a broad range of archival material from the 1940s, 1950s and early 1960s including newsreel clips, television news footage, U.S. government-produced films (including military training films), advertisements, television and radio programs. News footage reflected the prevailing understanding of the media and public.

Though the topic of atomic holocaust is a grave matter, much of the humor derives from the modern audience's reaction to the old training films, such as the Duck and Cover film shown in schools. A quote to illustrate what can be perceived as black humor, culled from the movie:  "Viewed from a safe distance, the atomic bomb is one of the most beautiful sights ever seen by man," a U.S. Army training film declares.

Historical context 
The Atomic Cafe, referred to as a "compilation verite" with no "voice of God narration" or any recently shot footage, was released at the height of nostalgia and cynicism in America. By 1982, Americans lost much of their faith in their government following the Vietnam War, the Watergate scandal, and the seemingly never-ending arms race with the Soviet Union. The Atomic Cafe reflects and reinforces this idea as it exposes how the atomic bomb's dangers were downplayed and how the government used films to shape public opinion.

The Atomic Cafe was also released during the Reagan administration's forced civil defense revival. Barry Posen and Stephen Van Evera explain this revival in their article "Defense Policy and the Reagan Administration: Departure from Containment" published in International Security. They argue that in 1981–82 the Reagan administration was moving from an essentially defensive grand strategy of containment to a more offensive strategy.  Due to the greater demands of its more offensive strategy "the Reagan Administration ... proposed the biggest military buildup since the Korean War." Of key relevance to The Atomic Cafe, the Reagan move toward offense included the adoption of a more aggressive nuclear strategy that required a large U.S. nuclear buildup.  Containment only required that U.S. strategic nuclear forces be capable of one mission: inflicting unacceptable damage on the Soviet Union even after absorbing an all-out Soviet surprise attack. To this "assured destruction" mission the Reagan administration added a second "counterforce" mission, which required the capacity to launch a nuclear first strike against Soviet strategic nuclear forces that would leave the Soviets unable to inflict unacceptable damage on the U.S. in retaliation. The U.S. had always invested in counterforce but the Reagan administration put even greater emphasis on it.  The counterforce mission was far more demanding than the assured destruction mission, and required a vast expansion of U.S. nuclear forces to fulfill. Civil defense was a component of a counterforce strategy, as it reduced Soviet retaliatory capacity, hence civil defense was a candidate for more spending under Reagan's counterforce nuclear strategy.  Posen and Van Evera argue that this counterforce strategy was a warrant for an open-ended U.S. nuclear buildup.

Bob Mielke, in "Rhetoric and Ideology in the Nuclear Test Documentary" (Film Quarterly) discusses the release of The Atomic Cafe:  "This satire feature was released at the height of the nuclear freeze movement (which was in turn responding to the Reagan administration's surreal handling of the arms race.)"

Patricia Aufderheide, in Documentary Film: A Very Short Introduction touches on the significance of The Atomic Cafe as a window into the past of government propaganda and disinformation during the years following the advent of the atomic bomb. "Propaganda, also known as disinformation, public diplomacy, and strategic communication, continues to be an important tool for governments. But stand-alone documentary is no longer an important part of public relations campaigns aimed at the general public."

Production
The Atomic Cafe was produced over a five-year period through the collaborative efforts of three directors: Jayne Loader and brothers Kevin and Pierce Rafferty. For this film, the Rafferty brothers and Loader formed a production company called The Archives Project. The filmmakers opted not to use narration.  Instead, they deployed carefully constructed sequences of film clips to make their points. Jayne Loader has referred to The Atomic Cafe as "compilation verite":  a compilation film with no "Voice of God" narration and no new footage added by the filmmakers. The soundtrack utilizes atomic-themed songs from the Cold War era to underscore the themes of the film.

The film cost $300,000 to make. The group did receive some financial support from outside sources, including the Film Fund, a New York City based non-profit. Grants comprised a nominal amount of the team's budget, and the film was largely funded by the filmmakers themselves. Jayne Loader stated in an interview, "Had we relied on grants, we would have starved." Pierce Rafferty helped to support the team and the film financially by working as a consultant and researcher on several other documentary films including El Salvador—Another Vietnam, the Oscar-nominated With Babies and Banners, and The Life and Times of Rosie the Riveter (which also was inducted into the National Film Registry). The Rafferty brothers had also received an inheritance that they used to support the team during the five years it took to make the film. About 75% of the film is made up of government materials that were in the public domain. Though they could use those public domain materials for free, they had to make copies of the films at their own expense. This along with the newsreel and commercial stock footage that comprises the other 25% of the film (along with the music royalties) represents the bulk of the trio's expenditures.

Release
The film was released on March 17, 1982 in New York, New York.  In August 1982, a tie-in companion book of the same name, written by Kevin Rafferty, Jayne Loader and Pierce Rafferty was released by Bantam Books. A 4K digital restoration of the film, created by IndieCollect, premiered at SXSW in 2018.

Home media
The 20th Anniversary Edition of the film was released in DVD format in Region 1 on March 26, 2002 by New Video Group. A 4K restored version was released on Blu-ray on December 4, 2018 by Kino Lorber.

In 1995, Jayne Loader's Public Shelter, an educational CD-ROM and website – with clips from The Atomic Cafe, plus additional material from declassified films, audio, photographs, and text files that archive the history, technology, and culture of the Atomic Age – was released by EJL Productions, a company formed by Jayne Loader and her first husband, Eric Schwaab.  Though it garnered positive national reviews and awards, the self-distributed Public Shelter CD-ROM sold only 500 copies and failed to find a national publisher.  Loader and Schwaab divorced. The website folded in 1999.

Reception

Critical response
When The Atomic Cafe was released, film critic Roger Ebert discussed the style and methods the filmmakers used, writing, "The makers of The Atomic Cafe sifted through thousands of feet of Army films, newsreels, government propaganda films and old television broadcasts to come up with the material in their film, which is presented without any narration, as a record of some of the ways in which the bomb entered American folklore. There are songs, speeches by politicians, and frightening documentary footage of guinea-pig American troops shielding themselves from an atomic blast and then exposing themselves to radiation neither they nor their officers understood." He also reviewed it with Gene Siskel who saw it more as a piece of Americana and a curio.

Critic Vincent Canby of the New York Times praised the film, calling the film "a devastating collage-film that examines official and unofficial United States attitudes toward the atomic age" and a film that "deserves national attention."  Canby was so taken by The Atomic Cafe that he mentioned it in a subsequent article – comparing it, favorably, to the 1981 blockbuster Porky's.

Critic Glenn Erickson discussed the editorial message of the film's producers: "The makers of The Atomic Cafe clearly have a message to get across, and to achieve that goal they use the inherent absurdity of their source material in creative ways. But they're careful to make sure they leave them essentially untransformed. When we see Nixon and J. Edgar Hoover posing with a strip of microfilm, we know we're watching a newsreel. The content isn't cheated. Except in wrapup montages, narration from one source isn't used over another. When raw footage is available, candid moments are seen of speechmakers (including President Truman) when they don't know the cameras are rolling. Caught laughing incongruously before a solemn report on an atom threat, Truman comes off as callously flip ..."

On Rotten Tomatoes the film has an approval rating of 93% based on reviews from 29 critics.

Deirdre Boyle, an Associate Professor and Academic Coordinator of the Graduate Certificate in Documentary Media Studies at The New School and an author of Subject to Change: Guerrilla Television Revisited, claimed that "By compiling propaganda or fictions denying 'nuclear-truth', The Atomic Cafe reveals the American public's lack of resistance to the fear generated by the government propaganda films and the misinformation they generated. Whether Americans of the time lacked the ability to resist or reject this misinformation about the atomic bomb is a debatable truth."

The Oxford Handbook of Science Fiction said it was, in quotes, a "mockumentary" from its editing and called it, "The most powerful satire of the official treatments of the atomic age".

Accolades
Wins
 Boston Society of Film Critics: BSFC Award, Best Documentary; 1983.

Nomination
 British Academy Film Awards: Flaherty Documentary Award, Kevin Rafferty, Jayne Loader and Pierce Rafferty; 1983.

Soundtrack

Atomic Cafe: Radioactive Rock 'n Roll, Blues, Country & Gospel is the soundtrack to the 1982 film The Atomic Cafe. A vinyl LP record was released in 1982 by Rounder Records.  Some of the credits for the record include: co-produced by Charles Wolfe, The Archives Project (Jayne Loader, Kevin Rafferty and Pierce Rafferty),  album cover artwork by Dennis Pohl, cover design by Mel Green, and booklet text by Charles Wolfe.

Track listing

Featured in the film but not the soundtrack were "13 Women" by Bill Haley and His Comets, Glenn Miller's version of "Flying Home", a couple of themes from Miklos Rozsa, Arthur Fiedler's take on Franz Liszt's Hungarian Rhapsody No. 2 and Charles Mackerras's interpretation of "The Old Castle" from Pictures at an Exhibition.

Legacy
In 2016, The Atomic Cafe was one of the 25 films selected for preservation in the annual United States' National Film Registry of the Library of Congress for being deemed "culturally, historically, or aesthetically significant". The press release for the Registry stated that "The influential film compilation 'Atomic Cafe' provocatively documents the post-World War II threat of nuclear war as depicted in a wide assortment of archival footage from the period ..."

Controversial documentary filmmaker Michael Moore was inspired by the film that he tweeted:
"This is the movie that told me that a documentary about a deadly serious subject could be very funny. Then I asked the people who made it to teach me how to do it. They did. That movie became my first – 'Roger & Me'."

See also
 Atomic Age
 Bruce Conner – experimental collage filmmaker that inspired the filmmakers similar in content
 Emile de Antonio – documentary filmmaker (which also inspired the co-directors) known for Point of Order, a 1964 study on Joseph McCarthy and the Army–McCarthy hearings
 Culture during the Cold War 
 Duck and cover
 How to Photograph an Atomic Bomb
 List of films about nuclear issues
 Nuclear weapons in popular culture
 Dr. Strangelove – the 1964 Kubrick classic to which critics compared The Atomic Cafe.
 Reefer Madness – the 1936 cult classic to which critics also compared it.
 Fallout – the video game series featuring Atomic Age aesthetics
 United States in the 1950s

References

Notes

External links
 "The Atomic Cafe", an essay by John Mills on the National Film Registry site
 
 
 
 
 Interview with filmmaker Jayne Loader about The Atomic Cafe
 Homepage
 The Atomic Cafe  officially posted by Kino Lorber on YouTube

1982 films
1982 documentary films
American documentary films
Cold War films
Collage film
Documentary films about nuclear war and weapons
1982 independent films
American independent films
Nuclear warfare
Compilation films
United States National Film Registry films
1980s English-language films
1980s American films
Postmodern films